Sidney H. Abramowitz (born May 21, 1960) is a former American football player.

References

1960 births
Living people
People from Culver City, California
Sportspeople from Los Angeles County, California
Players of American football from California
American football offensive tackles
Air Force Falcons football players
Tulsa Golden Hurricane football players
Baltimore Colts players
National Football League replacement players
Seattle Seahawks players
New York Jets players
Indianapolis Colts players
Military personnel from California